Hyloconis desmodii is a moth of the family Gracillariidae. It is known from Kyushu island Japan.

The wingspan is 5–6 mm.

The larvae feed on Desmodium racemosum. They probably mine the leaves of their host plant.

References

Lithocolletinae
Moths of Japan

Taxa named by Tosio Kumata
Moths described in 1963